Smokey's Haunt is the fourth studio album by Australian hip hop artist and member of The Herd, Urthboy.  It was released on 12 October 2012.

Overview 
Levinson's fourth album under the Urthboy moniker, released on the Elefant Traks label, was made available to the public on 12 October 2012. Produced by fellow Australian hip hop colleagues Count Bounce (TZU) and Hermitude, the album was selected as a "Feature Album" on national Australian radio station Triple J.

Jimblah, Solo and Alex Burnett (of Sparkadia) feature as guests on the album. Jimblah and Solo appear on a song entitled "On Your Shoulders" (Jimblah also appears on the song "Glimpses"), and Burnett features on the song "The Big Sleep".

Tour 
In late February 2013, a national Australian tour, in support of the fourth Urthboy album, was confirmed and a live band, featuring drums and keyboard(s)/piano(s), was also announced. Herd member Jane Tyrell was also named as a member of the touring group, while the support acts were identified as fellow Elefant Traks artist Jimblah and One Sixth from Melbourne, Australia. In 2013 Urthboy was announced as the national support for Paul Kelly's 'Spring & Fall' Tour—the selection follows multiple previous collaborations, including Urthboy's 2008 cover of "From Little Things Big Things Grow", and a combined cover of Hunters and Collectors' "Tears Of Joy" in early 2013.

Track listing

Charts

References 

2012 albums
Urthboy albums